Peleliu Naval Base was a major United States Navy sea and airbase base on Peleliu island, one of sixteen states of Palau. The United States Marine Corps took the island in the Battle of Peleliu during World War II. Battle of Peleliu was a costly conflict that started September 15, 1944, and ended November 27, 1944. On September 30, 1944, Peleliu is declared occupied. The taking of Peleliu and Morotai gave the sea and air protection needed for the later invasion of the Philippines. US Navy Seabee built a number of facilities at Peleliu Naval Base.

History
Empire of Japan had built up a very strong force on Palau and Truk. Japan had built two runways in an X pattern on the southern part of the island, now the Peleliu Airfield. The runways were about 3,900 feet long. Peleliu island is 5 1/2 half miles long and 2 1/2 miles wide. The coast is mostly rocky and has about 2 miles of sandy beaches. On October 12, 1944, Peleliu becomes the Marine island command center.  October 20, 1944, the 1st Marine Division on Peleliu was relieved by the United States Army 81st Infantry Division. Three US Navy Seabee groups were part of the US Marine's landing on Peleliu on September 15, 1944. The 33rd Seabee Battalions and 73rd Seabee Battalions, with Construction Battaltion Detachment 1054 helped get supplies on the beaches. The nature of the reefs around the island made getting supplies ashore difficult. Seabees used 24 self-propelled pontoon barges to shuttle cargo ashore. Three days after the landing Seabees built a pontoon floating pier to get out past the reef. On the four days after landing LST ships started to unload large cargo on the beach. With the airfield secured, Seabees removed debris and mines. On the fifth day after landing Seabees brought the Seabees' construction equipment to the airfield and started repair work. The eighth day after landing, September 23, the 4,000-foot airfield was opened and three squadrons of fighter planes landed and provided ground support for the troops still fighting. VMO-1 a Marine Observation Squadron also started operation from the Airfield. Seabees 33rd Battalion started construction of a runway that long-range bombers could use, 6,000 feet long, on September 23. On September 23, the bomber runway was opened and in used 24/7. During this time Seabees also built vast support facilities. At Blue Beach, a pontoon causeway was built for unloading and loading landing craft tank (LCT), completed on November 1, 1944. On November 16, 1944, Marine Vought F4U Corsair from Peleliu and Grumman TBF Avenger from Ulithi launch an attack on Empire of Japan troops on Yap Island. Because the captured Peleliu dock was small and not yet a deep enough, amphibious operations continued. LST-19 and LST-225 were some of the amphibious ships used to shuttle cargo ashore. Between November 4 and 9, 1944 a typhoon hit Peleliu. Some ships and some facilities were damaged but was quickly repaired. November 27, 1944 VMF-541, a night fighter squadron with Grumman F6F Hellcat of the United States Marine Corps. move to Leyte, they had been on Peleliu for four months. Peleliu Naval Base lacked a large protected fleet anchorage, thus Naval Base Ulithi became the US Navy's primary fleet support base in the western Pacific. The Army air base was abandoned in June 1945. Seabees dismantled and boxed up usable structures and goods, shipping them out starting July 11, 1945. The last Marines departed Peleliu Naval Base on July 1, 1947. Naval Base Peleliu did not have a port for fleet anchorage, the US Navy used Naval Base Kossol Roads at the north tip of Palau.

Facilities
Peleliu dock at 
Peleliu Airfield captured September 17, 1944
Concrete-block pier
Seabees Camp
Seabees depot
Aviation shop
Naval supply depot
Army supply depot
Headquarters
Fleet Post Office FPO# 3252 SF Peleliu, Palau Islands
Barracks – tent cities
Tank farm for aviation fuel
Tank farm for gasoline
Tank farm for diesel 
Naval hospital No. 20
Army Evacuation Hospital, 17th Army
Hospital 
Dispensaries
Improved LCT landing beach
Marine railway
Dry dock
Small-boat repair shop
 Ammunition magazine depot
16 miles of main roads
Crash boat base
Motor pool
Mess halls
Navy Communication Center
Power stations

Naval Base Angaur
Angaur is a small island 9 miles south of Peleliu, taken over after the Battle of Angaur. The US Army and Seabee built some facilities on the island:
 US Army 7,000-foot airstrip, Angaur Airstrip
 Hardstands for 120 planes
 Tank farm – 1,000-barrel aviation gasoline, 20,000-barrel diesel, 5,000-barrel motor gasoline
Aviation Barracks  – quonset-huts
coral breakwater small boat harbor
70-foot pier
Boat shop
30-ton marine railway
Aircraft boneyard at airstrip
Angaur Troops
US Army Air Force 494th Bombardment Squadron, 864th BS (B-24) September 30, 1944 – June 24, 1945 
US Army Air Force 494th BG, 865th BS (Consolidated B-24 Liberator, B-24) September 30, 1944 – June 24, 1945 
US Army Air Force 494th BG, 866th BS (B-24) Barking Sands September 30, 1944 – June 24, 1945 
US Army Air Force 494th BG, 867th BS (B-24) Barking Sands September 30, 1944 – June 24, 1945 
US Army Air Force 22nd Bombardment Group, HQ, 33rd BS (B-24) November 26, 1944 – June 24, 1945 
US Army Air Force 22nd BG, 2nd BS (B-24) November 28, 1944 – January 20, 1945 
US Army Air Force 22nd BG, 408th BS (B-24) December 1, 1944 – January 14, 1945
US Army Air Force 22nd BG, 19th BS (B-24) December 3, 1944 – January 27, 1945 
US Army Air Force 419th TCG (Douglas C-47 Skytrain detachment) January 31, 1945
US Marine Corps VMF-114
US Marine Corps VMF-121
US Marine Corps VMF-122

Troops
Some Troop stationed at Peleliu:
US Army Air Force, 28th PRS (F-5), Photographic Reconnaissance Squadron, September 24, 1944 – April 1, 1945, departed to Saipan
US Army Air Force, 421st Night Fighters, NFS (6 Northrop P-61 Black Widow) January 1945 – February 1945
US Marine Corps, VMF(N)-541 (F6F-3N) September 24, 1944 (Night fighter Grumman F6F Hellcat)
US Marine Corps, MABS-1, Marine Air Base Squadron 1, May 1945
US Navy, VR-13 (R4D), Patrol Squadron 1945
US Navy, Naval Air Transport Service (NATS) 1945

Post War

In 1947, Peleliu was officially put under United States the control, with United Nations approval. It became a part of the Trust Territory of the Pacific Islands. In 1978 Palau became an independent Nation, and Peleliu a state in the nation.

Lieutenant Ei Yamaguchi and 33 of his troops hid out on Peleliu not knowing the war had ended. In March 1947, the troops attacked US Marines on Peleliu. To stop the attacks an admiral of Japan came and talk to them, they then knew the war was over. Ei Yamaguchi and his men surrendered in April 1947.
Peleliu World War II Memorial Museum had artifacts and information from the 1944 Battle of Peleliu. The Peleliu World War II Memorial Museum was built in a damaged Japanese warehouse.
Built to remember the troops who lost their lives at the Battle of Peleliu in 1944.
Peleliu Battlefield is a National Register of Historic Places listings in Palau
 There was a large US Military Cemetery on Peliliu. Since then, were moved to other Cemeteries. At the former US Military Cemetery on Peleliu, is a cross and marker of the former cemetery.
 Over the island are a number of artifacts from the war:Japanese Tank type 95, Bomb shelters, Japanese 200 mm Cannon, Bulldozer Wreck, Ei Yamaguchi Hideout, Thousand Man Cave hideout, US Marines Landing Vehicle Tracked, crashed Avenger Aircraft atop Hill 100, crashed Japanese Zero fighter and more.

See also
US Naval Base Carolines
Fury in the Pacific
Japanese holdout
 , an amphibious assault ship named in memory of the battle
U.S. Naval Base Subic Bay
Espiritu Santo Naval Base
US Naval Advance Bases
Naval Advance Base Saipan
Service Squadron
 USAAF in the Central Pacific

External links
youtube, Peleliu remains planes and landing craft
youtube PACIFIC WAR (WWll) Island of Peleliu Island, Palau
youtube "They Came To An Island" U.S. Navy Civil Engineer Corps Wwii Seabees Construction Battalions 29564

References

Airfields of the United States Navy
Military installations closed in the 1940s
Closed installations of the United States Navy
Palau in World War II
Angaur